Elizabeth Rosa Landau is an American science writer and communicator. She is a Senior Communications Specialist at NASA Headquarters. She was a Senior Storyteller at the NASA Jet Propulsion Laboratory previously.

Education 
Landau grew up in Bryn Mawr, Pennsylvania. As a child, she watched Carl Sagan's TV series Cosmos, which helped inspire her love of space.

She earned a bachelor's degree in anthropology at Princeton University (magna cum laude) in 2006. As a Princeton student, she completed study-abroad programs at University of Seville and Universidad de León. During her junior year in Princeton, she was the editor-in-chief of Innovation, the university's student science magazine. In the summer of 2004, she became a production intern at CNN en Español in New York. She earned a master's in journalism from Columbia University, where she focused on politics.

Career 
Landau began to write and produce for CNN's website in 2007 as a Master's Fellow, and returned full-time in 2008. Here she co-founded the CNN science blog, Light Years. She covered a variety of topics including Pi Day. In 2012, Landau interviewed Scott Maxwell about the Curiosity rover at the NASA Jet Propulsion Laboratory.

NASA career 
In 2014, she became a media relations specialist at the NASA Jet Propulsion Laboratory, where she led media strategy for Dawn (spacecraft), Voyager, Spitzer, NuSTAR, WISE, Planck and Hershel. She led NASA's effort to share the TRAPPIST-1 exoplanet system with the world on February 22, 2017. In January 2018, she was appointed a Senior Storyteller at the Jet Propulsion Laboratory. In February 2020, she became a Senior Communications Specialist at NASA Headquarters.

Writing career 

Landau has written for CNN, Marie Claire, New Scientist, Nautilus, Scientific American, Vice and The Wall Street Journal.

Landau interviewed astronomer Virginia Trimble for Quanta Magazine in November 2019.

References

External links 

 

Living people
Science communicators
American science writers
Women science writers
Columbia University Graduate School of Journalism alumni
Princeton University alumni
American women journalists
21st-century American journalists
21st-century American women writers
Year of birth missing (living people)